Fernand Mossé (25 May 1892 – 10 July 1956) was a 20th-century French philologist and historian, specialized in Germanic languages and German literature.

Biography 
An agrégé of English, Fernand Mossé was a lecturer at the Bangor University in Wales. He later taught in  lycées in Nice and Nancy. In 1926, he was appointed  at the École pratique des hautes études. In 1938, he defended his doctoral dissertation, devoted to periphrastic forms of English. In 1949 he was appointed to the chair of languages and literatures of Germanic origin at the Collège de France.

Selected bibliography 
1914: La Laxdoela Saga : légende historique islandaise, Paris, Alcan (translation)
1933: La Saga de Grettir, Paris, Aubier Montaigne (translation)
1938: Histoire de la forme périphrastique être + participe présent en germanique, Paris, Klincksieck
1942: Manuel de la langue gotique, Paris, Aubier Montaigne
1942: Manuel de l'allemand du Moyen Âge, des origines au XIVe siècle (with Alfred Jolivet), Paris, Aubier Montaigne 
1946: Manuel de l'anglais du Moyen Âge, des origines au XIVe siècle, 4 vol., Paris, Aubier Montaigne
1947: Esquisse d'une histoire de la langue anglaise
1959: Histoire de la littérature allemande (ed), Aubier

External links 
 Fernand Mossé on data.bnf.fr
 Manuel de l'anglais du Moyen Age des origines au 14e siècle on Persée

French philologists
Germanists
Academic staff of the Collège de France
Academic staff of the École pratique des hautes études
Linguists of Germanic languages
Writers from Marseille
1892 births
1956 deaths
Corresponding Fellows of the Medieval Academy of America
20th-century philologists